Metamfepramone (INN, also known as dimethylcathinone, dimethylpropion, and dimepropion (BAN)) is a stimulant drug of the phenethylamine, and cathinone chemical classes. Dimethylcathinone was evaluated as an appetite suppressant and for the treatment of hypotension, but was never widely marketed.

It was used as a recreational drug in Israel under the name rakefet, but was made illegal in 2006.

Metamfepramone is metabolized to produce N-methylpseudoephedrine and methcathinone. It has also been found to be about 1.6 times less potent than methcathinone, making it roughly equipotent to cathinone itself.

Legality  
In the United States Metamfepramone (N,N-Dimethyl-cathinone) is considered a schedule 1 controlled substance as a positional isomer of Mephedrone

See also 
 Dimethylamphetamine
 Substituted cathinone

References 

Stimulants
Cathinones
Norepinephrine-dopamine releasing agents